Vincent Steven Abbott (born May 31, 1958) is an English-born former American football player. Born in London, Abbott played at the University of Washington, then transferred to Cal State Fullerton, and went undrafted in 1981. He played for the USFL for the Los Angeles Express. During the 1987 pre-season, Abbott went 7 for 8 on field goals, four over 40 yards beating out veteran kicker Rolf Benirschke.

In his first NFL game, the 1987 season opener in Kansas City against the Kansas City Chiefs, Abbott successfully made two out of three field goals, a thirty-two yarder and a thirty-three yarder, the second tying the game at 13 with just over three minutes to play.   In game 7 against the Cleveland Browns. Vince Abbott, successfully converted a twenty-yard kick with 1:46 remaining in the game, tying the score at 24 apiece, and he was able to convert a 33-yard overtime kick to secure victory for the Chargers, 27-24.  That kick lifted the Chargers to 6-1, their best start since their first season in 1961, and put them in first place in their division.  Three field goals each against the Indianapolis Colts including a game-winning field goal from 38 yards. Week 9 against the Raiders, Vince kicked 3 field goals enabling  the Chargers to win 16-14. The San Diego Chargers momentum going as they ran their record to 8-1.
Vince Abbott made his mark, kicking under pressure. In the Raider game, it was his first field goal attempt when the Chargers were leading.

Although the Chargers would fade, losing their final six games to miss the playoffs, Abbott retained his kicking duties into 1989, having finished the 1987 with a 13 for 22 field goals, with seven of his misses coming from beyond forty yards. Abbott played in 12 games during 1988, for a Chargers team that went 6-10, and converted 8 out of 12 field goals.  This was his last season in the NFL; he ended his career a perfect 13 for 13 on game-winning field goals.

Vince Abbott resides in Newport Beach and is an avid power lifter benching over 475 lbs. 
His career after the NFL includes medical sales and business development. 
Mr. Abbott continues to coach aspiring field goal kickers and weight lifters.

References

External links
Vince Abbott

1958 births
Living people
American football placekickers
Cal State Fullerton Titans football players
English expatriate sportspeople in the United States
English players of American football
Sportspeople from London
San Diego Chargers players
Washington Huskies football players